At the 1932 Summer Olympics in Los Angeles, a modern pentathlon event was contested.

Participating nations

A total of 25 athletes from 10 nations competed at the Los Angeles Games:

Events

Individual competition

References

 
1932 Summer Olympics events
1932